Brotherhood is the fourth studio album by English rock band New Order, released on 29 September 1986 by Factory Records. It contains a mixture of post-punk and electronic styles, roughly divided between the two sides. The album includes "Bizarre Love Triangle", the band's breakthrough single in the United States and Australia; it was the only track from the album released as a single and as a video (although "State of the Nation" was added to most CD editions).

The album sleeve, created by Peter Saville, is a photograph of a sheet of titanium–zinc alloy. Some early releases came in a metallic sleeve.

Music
Brotherhood saw the band further exploring their mix of post-punk and electronic styles, with the track listing being conceptually divided into "disco and rock sides". Stephen Morris stated that the album "was kind of done in a schizophrenic mood that we were trying to do one side synthesizers and one side guitars", which he retrospectively stated "didn't quite work".

In a 1987 interview with Option, Morris commented that the "mad ending" to "Every Little Counts" – which sounds like a vinyl record needle skipping the groove – is similar to the ending of The Beatles' "A Day in the Life". Morris said: "What we should have done is make the tape version sound like the tape getting chewed up. The CD could have the sticking sound."

Influences of Richard Wagner's "Prelude" to Das Rheingold can be heard throughout the track "All Day Long."  New Order have subsequently used the piece as a concert opener.

Critical reception

Reviewing Brotherhood for the Los Angeles Times, Steve Hochman wrote that New Order "makes atmospheric grooves with more finesse than any contemporary computer-rocker." In his "Consumer Guide" column for The Village Voice, Robert Christgau selected the album as a "pick hit" and said: "The tempos are a touch less stately, the hooks a touch less subliminal. Bernard Albrecht's vocals have taken on so much affect they're humane. And the joke closer softens up a skeptic like me to the pure, physically exalting sensation of the music."

In a 1993 retrospective review, Q critic Stuart Maconie described Brotherhood as "often overlooked, nestling as it does between two superior studio albums", and ultimately "more for the initiated than the first-time buyer." John Bush of AllMusic was more favourable, writing that "for better and worse, this was a New Order with nothing more to prove – witness the tossed-off lyrics and giggles on 'Every Little Counts' – aside from continuing to make great music." David Quantick of Uncut noted "an increased tension between the frequent beauty of the music and the band's Northern self-consciousness" and concluded: "This was New Order becoming New Order and if anyone was entitled to not be Joy Division, they certainly were." The A.V. Club Josh Modell called Brotherhood "an unsung great of the catalog that's dwarfed a bit by its massive single".

Track listing

Notes
 Most CD copies, with the sole exception of Qwest Records' 1988 release, feature the 12" version of "State of the Nation" as a bonus track (although it is not listed as such). It is identical to the version found on Substance. It runs for 6:32, making the album's new total running time approximately 43:39.

Notes
 "True Faith" (Eschreamer Dub) and "Blue Monday '88" (Dub) are only incorrectly listed on the disc itself. The booklet included with all five re-issued 2008 Collector's Edition New Order Factory Records studio albums correctly identifies them.

Personnel
Credits adapted from the liner notes of Brotherhood.

 New Order – production
 Michael Johnson – engineering
 Peter Saville Associates – design
 Trevor Key – photography

Charts

Release history
 UK LP – Factory Records (FACT 150)
 UK Music cassette – Factory Records (FACT 150C)
 US LP – Qwest (25511-1)
 US cassette – Qwest (9 25511-4)
 Canada CD – Factory Records / PolyGram (830,527-2)
 UK CD (1993 re-release) – London Records (520,021-2)

References

External links

1986 albums
Factory Records albums
New Order (band) albums